The 1991–92 League of Ireland First Division season was the seventh season of the League of Ireland First Division, the second tier of the league system.

Overview
The First Division was contested by 10 teams and Limerick City F.C. won the division. Limerick were managed by Sam Allardyce, who was player-manager for one season only, taking Limerick back to the Premier Division a year after they were relegated.

Final table

See also
 1991–92 League of Ireland Premier Division

References

League of Ireland First Division seasons
2
Ireland